The one hundred euro note (€100) is one of the higher value euro banknotes and has been used since the introduction of the euro (in its cash form) in 2002. The note is used daily by some 343 million Europeans and in the 25 countries which have it as their sole currency (with 23 legally adopting it). In December 2022, there were approximately 3,928,000,000 hundred euro banknotes in circulation in the eurozone. It is the third most widely circulated denomination, accounting for 13.3% of the total banknotes.

It is the third largest note, measuring  ×  and has a green colour scheme. The hundred euro notes depict bridges and arches/doorways in the Baroque and Rococo style (17th and 18th centuries). The hundred euro note contains several complex security features such as watermarks, invisible ink, holograms and microprinting that document its authenticity.

The new banknotes of the Europa series 100 euro banknote were released on 28 May 2019.

History 

The euro was founded on 1 January 1999, when it became the currency of over 300 million people in Europe. For the first three years of its existence it was an invisible currency, only used in accountancy. Euro cash was not introduced until 1 January 2002, when it replaced the national banknotes and coins of the countries in eurozone 12, such as the French franc and the Spanish peseta.

Slovenia joined the Eurozone in 2007, Cyprus and Malta in 2008, Slovakia in 2009, Estonia in 2011 Latvia in 2014, and Lithuania joined in 2015.

The changeover period 
The changeover period during which the former currencies' notes and coins were exchanged for those of the euro lasted about two months, going from 1 January 2002 until 28 February 2002. The official date on which the national currencies ceased to be legal tender varied from member state to member state. The earliest date was in Germany, where the mark officially ceased to be legal tender on 31 December 2001, though the exchange period lasted for two months more. Even after the old currencies ceased to be legal tender, they continued to be accepted by national central banks for periods ranging from ten years to forever.

Changes 
Notes printed before November 2003 bear the signature of the first president of the European Central Bank, Wim Duisenberg, who was replaced on 1 November 2003 by Jean-Claude Trichet, whose signature appears on issues from November 2003 to March 2012. Notes issued after March 2012 bear the signature of the third president of the European Central Bank, Mario Draghi.

Two series of euro notes are in circulation together. The European Central Bank will, in due course, announce when banknotes from the first series are to lose legal tender status.

The first series notes do not reflect the expansion of the European Union: Cyprus is not depicted on these notes as the map does not extend far enough east, and Malta is also missing as it does not meet the current series' minimum size for depiction. The second series of banknotes has now been issued, with new production and anti-counterfeiting techniques, but the design is of the same theme and colours identical to the first series; bridges and arches. However, they are still recognisable as a new series.

Design 

The one hundred euro note measures at  ×  and has a green colour scheme. All bank notes depict bridges and arches/doorways in a different historical European style; the hundred euro note shows the Baroque and Rococo style (17th and 18th centuries). Although Robert Kalina's original designs were intended to show real monuments, for political reasons the bridge and art are merely hypothetical examples of the architectural era.

Like all euro notes, it contains the denomination, the EU flag, the signature of the president of the ECB and the initials of said bank in different EU languages, a depiction of EU territories overseas, the stars from the EU flag and twelve security features as listed below.

Security features (first series) 

The hundred euro note is protected by:
 Colour changing ink used on the numeral located on the back of the note, that appears to change colour from purple to brown, when the note is tilted.
 A see through number printed in the top corner of the note, on both sides, appear combine perfectly to form the value numeral when held against the light.
 A glossy stripe, situated at the back of the note, showing the value numeral and the euro symbol.
 A hologram, used on the note which appears to see the hologram image change between the value and a window or doorway, but in the background, it appears to be rainbow-coloured concentric circles of micro-letters moving from the centre to the edges of the patch.
 A EURion constellation; the EURion constellation is a pattern of symbols found on a number of banknote designs worldwide since about 1996. It is added to help software detect the presence of a banknote in a digital image.
 Watermarks, which appear when held up to the light.
 Raised printing in the main image, the lettering and the value numerals on the front of the banknotes will be raised.
 Ultraviolet ink; the paper itself does not glow, fibres embedded in the paper do appear, and be coloured red, blue and green, the EU flag is green and has orange stars, the ECB President's, currently Mario Draghi's, signature turns green, the large stars and small circles on the front glow and the European map, a bridge and the value numeral on the back appear in yellow.
 Microprinting, on various areas of the banknotes there is microprinting, for example, inside the "ΕΥΡΩ" (EURO in Greek characters) on the front. The micro-text is sharp, but not blurred.
 A security thread, embedded in the banknote paper. The thread will appear as a dark stripe when held up to the light. The word "EURO" and the value is embedded in tiny letters on the thread.
 Perforations in the hologram which will form the euro symbol. There are also small numbers showing the value.
 A matted surface; the note paper is made out of pure cotton, which feels crisp and firm, but not limp or waxy.
 Barcodes,
 A serial number.

Security features (Europa series) 

The 100 euro notes are made of pure cotton fibre, which improves their durability as well as giving the banknotes a distinctive feel. The printer code is positioned at the right of 9 o'clock star.

Circulation 

The European Central Bank closely monitors the circulation and stock of the euro coins and banknotes. It is a task of the Eurosystem to ensure an efficient and smooth supply of euro notes and to maintain their integrity throughout the euro area.

In December 2022, there were  €100 banknotes in circulation around the euro area, with a total value of €.

This is a net number, i.e. the number of banknotes issued by the Eurosystem central banks, without further distinction as to who is holding the currency issued, thus also including the stocks held by credit institutions.

Besides the date of the introduction of the first set to January 2002, the publication of figures is more significant through the maximum number of banknotes raised each year. The number is higher the end of the year.

The figures are as follows:

On 28 May 2019, a new 'Europe' series was issued.

The first series of notes were issued in conjunction with those for a few weeks in the series 'Europe' until existing stocks are exhausted, then gradually withdrawn from circulation. Both series thus run parallel but the proportion tends inevitably to a sharp decrease in the first series.

The latest figures provided by the ECB are the following :

Legal information 
Legally, both the European Central Bank and the central banks of the eurozone countries have the right to issue the 7 different euro banknotes. In practice, only the national central banks of the zone physically issue and withdraw euro banknotes. The European Central Bank does not have a cash office and is not involved in any cash operations.

Tracking 
There are several communities of people at European level, most of which is EuroBillTracker, that, as a hobby, it keeps track of the euro banknotes that pass through their hands, to keep track and know where they travel or have traveled. The aim is to record as many notes as possible in order to know details about its spread, like from where and to where they travel in general, follow it up, like where a ticket has been seen in particular, and generate statistics and rankings, for example, in which countries there are more tickets. EuroBillTracker has registered over 176 million notes as of May 2018, worth more than €3.257 billion.

References

External links 
 

Euro banknotes
One-hundred-base-unit banknotes